Musicians and Soldiers is a circa 1626 painting by the French Caravaggisto Valentin de Boulogne. It is now in the Musée des Beaux-Arts of Strasbourg, France. Its inventory number is 1280.

The painting depicts a milieu that Valentin de Boulogne knew very well and frequently used as a pictorial motive: Roman nightlife, with drinkers and musicians in an inn. At the center of the painting, but in the background, stands an androgynous female tambourine player; to her left and on an edge of the table sits a just as androgynous male violin player, who dominates the composition by his size. The mood of the two drinkers and of the three musicians is one of pensiveness, and the whole painting is pervaded with melancholy.

References

External links

Musiciens et Soldats, presentation on the museum's website

Paintings in the collection of the Musée des Beaux-Arts de Strasbourg
Paintings by Valentin de Boulogne
Oil on canvas paintings
1626 paintings
Baroque paintings
Cultural depictions of musicians